Robert Gordon Orr  (born March 20, 1948) is a Canadian former professional ice hockey player, widely acknowledged as one of the greatest of all time. Orr used his ice skating speed, scoring, and play-making abilities to revolutionize the position of defenceman. He played in the National Hockey League (NHL) for 12 seasons, the first 10 with the Boston Bruins, followed by two with the Chicago Black Hawks. Orr remains the only defenceman to have won the league scoring title with two Art Ross Trophies. He holds the record for most points and assists in a single season by a defenceman. Orr won a record eight consecutive Norris Trophies as the NHL's best defenceman and three consecutive Hart Trophies as the league's most valuable player (MVP). Orr was inducted into the Hockey Hall of Fame in 1979 at age 31, the youngest to be inducted at that time. In 2017, Orr was named by the National Hockey League as one of the "100 Greatest NHL Players" in history.

Orr started in organized hockey at age eight. He first played as a forward, but moved to defence  and was encouraged to use his skating skills to control play. Orr's play in Ontario provincial competition attracted the notice of NHL scouts as early as age twelve. At fourteen, Orr joined the Oshawa Generals, the Bruins' junior hockey affiliate, and he was an all-star for three of his four seasons.

In 1966, Orr joined the Boston Bruins, a team that had not won a Stanley Cup since 1941 and had not qualified for the playoffs since 1959. With Orr, the Bruins won the Stanley Cup twice, in 1970 and 1972, and lost in the 1974 Final. In both victories, Orr scored the clinching goal and was named the playoff MVP. In the final achievement of his career, he was the MVP of the 1976 Canada Cup international hockey tournament. In 1976, Orr left Boston as a free agent to join the Black Hawks, but repeated injuries had effectively destroyed his left knee, and he retired in 1978 at age 30.

Orr's first professional contract was one of the first in professional ice hockey to be negotiated by an agent. It made him the highest-paid player in NHL history as a rookie. His second contract was the first million-dollar contract in the NHL. However, after his retirement, Orr learned he was deeply in debt and he had to sell off most of what he owned. Orr broke with his agent Alan Eagleson and sued the Black Hawks to settle his contract. Orr and his family returned to Boston where Orr went into business to rebuild his finances. Orr aided the investigations that led to Eagleson's fraud convictions and disbarment. Orr also supported a lawsuit that challenged the NHL over its control of its pension plan.

After his hockey career, he became a scout for several professional teams. Orr entered the player agent business in 1996 and was the president of the Orr Hockey Group agency, until its acquisition by the Wasserman Media Group in 2018. Orr is also active in charitable works and in television commercials. Since 1996, Orr has coached a team of junior hockey players in the annual CHL Top Prospects Game.

Hockey career

Early life

Orr was born in the town of Parry Sound on the shores of Georgian Bay in Ontario, Canada. His grandfather, Robert Orr, was a top-tier soccer pro player who emigrated from Ballymena, Northern Ireland to Parry Sound early in the 20th century. Orr's father, Doug Orr, had once been a hockey prospect and was invited to join the Atlantic City Seagulls in 1942 but turned down the offer. Doug Orr instead joined the Royal Canadian Navy, serving during the Second World War. He returned after the war to Parry Sound and Arva Steele, whom he had married before he left for war, and to a job in the CIL dynamite factory. Doug and Arva had five children together: Patricia, Ronnie, Bobby, Penny, and Doug Jr. Bobby was born on March 20, 1948, at St. Joseph's Hospital, where his grandmother Elsie Orr was a nurse. Bobby was a sick baby at birth and his survival was tenuous.

Bobby Orr displayed his hockey talents from an early age. Orr played his first organized hockey in 1953 at age five, in the "minor squirt" division, a year after getting his first skates and playing shinny. Although he was tiny and somewhat frail, he soon was able to skate faster than anyone his own age, with speed he demonstrated in races around the rink and in games. Until he was ten years old, Orr played on the wing, as a forward. His coach, former NHL player Bucko McDonald, moved Orr to defence. Although Orr played defence, McDonald encouraged Orr to use his talents as a stickhandler, skater, and scorer to make offensive rushes. According to McDonald: "I used to tell Doug the kid was in his natural position when he played defence. You didn't have to be genius to see that – honest. I don't think Doug agreed, but he accepted my decision." Orr would later credit McDonald: "Bucko taught me almost everything I know."

Orr was noticed by the Boston Bruins in the spring of 1961, playing in a youth hockey tournament in Gananoque, Ontario. The Bruins' Wren Blair described him as "a combination of Doug Harvey and Eddie Shore." The Bruins immediately pursued Orr. Blair made regular visits to the family home. In the fall of 1961, the Bruins invested  (CA$ in  dollars) to sponsor his minor hockey team. Although three other NHL teams (Toronto Maple Leafs, Detroit Red Wings, and Montreal Canadiens) were interested in Orr, he signed in 1962 with the Bruins. Orr explained that he signed with the Bruins because "they're a team of the future. They're rebuilding and I want to be part of that building program."

Blair was involved with a plan to start a new Oshawa Generals franchise in a new arena in Oshawa, Ontario. Despite the Bruins already having a junior hockey franchise, the Niagara Falls Flyers, Blair convinced the Bruins to own another. He arranged a deal whereby the Bruins owned 51% of the franchise, but Orr would have to play for Oshawa. When Orr was fourteen, Blair convinced the Orr family to allow Bobby to attend the Flyers' tryout camp. When camp ended and it came time to sign with the Bruins, a meeting with Bruins' owner Weston Adams went sour and Orr headed back to Parry Sound. Blair was able to smooth over the situation and convince Arva Bobby was old enough to leave home. To get the Orrs' signatures on a "C" Form, committing Bobby to the Bruins at age eighteen, Blair agreed to have Bobby stay in Parry Sound for his schooling, skipping Generals' practices and only driving south to play games on weekends, a three-hour trip one way.

Orr debuted in junior in the 1962–63 season for the new Generals in the new Metro Junior A League. Orr was only fourteen, competing against eighteen-, nineteen- and twenty-year-olds. The 1963–64 season brought further changes as the Metro League folded and Oshawa joined the Ontario Hockey Association (OHA). Orr moved to Oshawa, where he started attending R. S. McLaughlin high school and boarded with a local family. Orr scored 29 goals to set a junior record for goals by a defenceman and was named to the OHA's first All-Star team.

Orr's goal and point totals increased every year during his junior career, and he was named to the OHA First-All Star team every season he was in the OHA. Orr had his best season in 1965–66, his fourth season of junior. Orr scored 38 goals to increase his goal-scoring record and finished with 94 points to average two points per game for the Generals. The Generals finished fourth in the league, but won the OHA championship, the J. Ross Robertson Cup, by defeating the St. Catharines Black Hawks, the Montreal Junior Canadiens and the Kitchener Rangers. The team defeated the Northern Ontario champions North Bay Trappers and the Quebec champions Shawinigan Bruins to win a berth in the Memorial Cup Final for the junior championship of Canada.

Oshawa's hopes in the 1966 Memorial Cup Final were damaged when Orr suffered a groin injury against Shawinigan, a painful injury that weakens a player's skating ability. To promote the event, held in Toronto's Maple Leaf Gardens, the Generals had advertised it would be the last chance to see Orr in junior and were anxious for him to play. Bruins' management demanded Orr not play in the Final, not wanting to risk further damage to their property. Orr and his parents, however, were adamant he be allowed to play for the national championship. As he had not signed to the Bruins, they threatened he would never play for Boston if he was held out. Blair decided to defy the Bruins' ownership and let Orr play. While Orr dressed and played some, he was not a factor and Edmonton defeated Oshawa for the Cup. Oshawa coach Bep Guidolin was fired for letting Orr play, while Blair left the organization of his own accord to join the expansion Minnesota North Stars.

Orr and Eagleson
By the time Orr turned 16 in 1964, he was still two years away from playing in the NHL and his father Doug was dissatisfied with the Bruins' treatment of the prospect. Doug had asked the Bruins' Blair for more money for Bobby and was turned down. Doug Orr met Toronto lawyer Alan Eagleson at a juvenile fastball tournament dinner in Parry Sound and asked Eagleson to help out with the situation. Eagleson agreed to work with the family for free and continued to do so for the next two years. Bobby and Eagleson developed a relationship Orr would later describe as being like brothers. The two soon became a team, discussing Bobby's future plans without his father Doug.

Eagleson was determined to get Orr a top salary. When Hap Emms, the general manager of the Bruins offered a US$5,000 (US$ in  dollars) signing bonus and US$7,000 and US$8,000 (US$ and US$ in  dollars) for his first two years in the league, Eagleson countered with US$100,000 (US$ in  dollars) for the two years. Orr would refuse to play with the Bruins and played for Canada's national team instead, like Carl Brewer. Orr wanted desperately to play in the NHL, but he went along with Eagleson's strategy and was willing to play for the nationals. The Bruins and Orr agreed on a US$25,000 signing bonus (US$ in  dollars), and a salary "less than $100,000" for the two years, a figure kept secret. Speculation has ranged on an annual salary of US$25,000 to US$40,000 (US$ to US$ in  dollars) at a time when the typical maximum rookie salary was US$9,000. (US$ in  dollars) The official signing ceremony was done on Emms' boat, the Barbara Lynn, where Eagleson and Emms had conferred during negotiations.

At the time, it made Orr the highest-paid player in league history. Beyond that, the signing became one of the most important in the history of professional hockey. Until that time, players had been forced to accept whatever NHL management paid in salaries. It was the start of the player's agent era in professional hockey. For Eagleson, it was the start of his sports business empire. Based on the Orr signing, Eagleson would become the executive director of the new National Hockey League Players' Association (NHLPA) and started on his rise to become one of the most powerful men in the sport and business of ice hockey.

Bruins career

1966–67
Orr joined the Bruins for the 1966–67 season, his first as a professional. The Bruins were not convinced Orr belonged on defence, trying him out at centre first. Through the pre-season, Orr was given jersey number 27. With Orr's junior number (2) retired in honour of Eddie Shore, the Bruins offered him jersey number 5, that of past Bruins star Dit Clapper, prior to the regular season, but Orr instead chose jersey number 4, which had been vacated by veteran defenceman Albert Langlois. Orr made his NHL regular-season debut on October 19, 1966, against the Detroit Red Wings, getting one assist. On October 22, he scored his first NHL goal against the Montreal Canadiens. It was a slap shot past Gump Worsley and the Boston Garden crowd gave Orr a standing ovation.

In that first season, Orr was challenged by the veterans, and he earned respect by defeating Montreal tough guy Ted Harris in his first NHL fight. On December 4, 1966, Toronto Maple Leafs' defenceman Marcel Pronovost checked him into the boards, injuring Orr's knees for the first time in the NHL. He would miss nine games and the Bruins would lose six of them. The team finished with a 17–43–10 record, leaving the Bruins in last place. However, attendance at Boston Garden increased by forty-one thousand fans.

For the season, Orr scored 13 goals and 28 assists, one of the best rookie seasons in NHL history to that point by a defenceman. Orr won the Calder Memorial Trophy as the league's outstanding rookie and was named to the NHL's Second All-Star team. New York Rangers defenceman Harry Howell won the Norris Trophy as the league's best defenceman that year. In accepting the award, Howell said he was glad to win when he did, predicting "Orr will own this trophy from now on." Orr was runner-up in voting.

1967–68
In 1967–68, his second season, injuries limited Orr to just 46 games in which he scored 11 goals and had 20 assists. Prior to the season, Orr had injured his right knee during a charity game in Winnipeg during the summer requiring five weeks in a cast. In December, a Frank Mahovlich check caused a fracture of Orr's collar bone and a shoulder separation. Orr returned in January in time to play in the NHL All-Star Game, his first of eight appearances overall. Orr had to sit out five games afterwards due to soreness in his left knee. In February, he had to leave a game against Detroit after his left knee went stiff. He would receive the first of his many operations on the knee, repairing ligament and removing cartilage. Orr did return to finish the season, but required an operation during the off-season to remove a bone chip. Despite the injuries, Orr won the first of a record eight consecutive Norris trophies and was named to the NHL's first All-Star team and finished fourth in the voting for the Hart Trophy.

After finishing last in 1966–67, the Bruins qualified for the 1968 playoffs, their first appearance in the playoffs since the 1958–59 season. In the pre-season, the Bruins added Phil Esposito, Fred Stanfield and Ken Hodge from the Chicago Black Hawks in one of the most famous deals ever. The Bruins also added rookies Glen Sather and Derek Sanderson, developing a more aggressive image that led to the nickname of the 'Big Bad Bruins.' The Bruins, happy to make the playoffs, were swept by eventual champion Montreal in the first round.

1968–69
In 1968–69, Orr skipped the pre-season to rest the knee but was in uniform for the season's start. He required an ice pack on the knee after every game and missed nine games after he caught a skate in a crack in the ice, twisting his knee. He returned to the line-up and finished the season playing through the pain, sometimes struggling to get up to speed and relying on teammates instead of making the plays himself. In other games, Orr was outstanding, scoring his first career NHL hat trick on December 14 against Chicago, adding two assists for a five-point night. He scored 21 goals on the season, breaking the goal-scoring record for a defenceman, and totalled 64 points to set a new point-scoring record for one season for a defenceman. He again won the Norris Trophy while nabbing a First-Team All-Star selection and finishing third in the Hart Trophy balloting.

Orr feuded with Toronto rookie defenceman Pat Quinn that season. In a late-season game, Orr attempted to knock the puck loose from Maple Leafs goaltender Bruce Gamble and Quinn cross-checked Orr to the ice. Orr kicked Quinn and Quinn kicked Orr. On-ice officials broke it up, but the feud continued into the 1969 playoffs. The Bruins finished second in the NHL's East Division and drew the Maple Leafs in the first round. In the first game, in Boston, Quinn caught Orr with his head down during a rush, and caught him with an open-ice hit, knocking Orr unconscious. Quinn, assessed five minutes for elbowing, was attacked in the penalty box by a fan and Quinn swung at the fan with his stick, breaking the glass. When Quinn returned, the Boston fans showered garbage onto the ice. Orr was carried out on a stretcher to the dressing room where he revived after the concussion. According to a Boston police officer at the scene, "The fans here don't like anybody to touch Orr. He's their Frank Merriwell and Jack Armstrong rolled into one. To my thinking, it looked like a clean check." The game degenerated into a brawl after the score reached 10–0 for the Bruins. The Bruins went on to sweep the Maple Leafs before losing in six games to the Montreal Canadiens in the second round. Orr returned for the third game against Toronto, getting two assists as the Bruins won their first games in Toronto since 1965.

1969–70: OT Winner, first cup

In 1969–70, Orr almost doubled his scoring total from the previous season, to 120 points, six shy of the league record (which had been set by his teammate Phil Esposito the previous season), leading the league in scoring. , Orr is the only defenceman in history to win the Art Ross Trophy as the league's leading scorer, which he also achieved a second time, in 1974–75. In addition to the Norris and the Art Ross, Orr captured the first of three consecutive Hart Trophies as regular-season MVP and later won the Conn Smythe Trophy for his playoff performance, becoming the only player in history to win four major NHL awards in one season.

Orr went on to lead the Bruins in a march through the 1970 playoffs scoring nine goals and 11 assists.  The march culminated on May 10, 1970, when he scored one of the most famous goals in hockey history and one that gave Boston its first Stanley Cup since 1941. The goal came off a give-and-go pass with teammate Derek Sanderson at the 40-second mark of the first overtime period in the fourth game, helping to complete a sweep of the St. Louis Blues. According to Orr:

If it had gone by me, it's a two-on-one, so I got a little lucky there, but Derek gave me a great pass and when I got the pass I was moving across. As I skated across, Glenn had to move across the crease and had to open his pads a little. I was really trying to get the puck on net, and I did. As I went across, Glenn's legs opened. I looked back, and I saw it go in, so I jumped.

The subsequent photograph by Ray Lussier of a horizontal Orr flying through the air, his arms raised in victory – he had been tripped by Blues' defenceman Noel Picard after scoring the goal – has become one of the most famous and recognized hockey images of all time—and today is highlighted in the opening sequence of the Canadian Broadcasting Corporation's Hockey Night in Canada telecasts.

1970–71
The following season, the powerhouse Bruins shattered dozens of league offensive records. Orr himself finished second in league scoring with 139 points (37 goals and 102 assists), thirteen points behind Esposito, while setting records that still stand for points in a season by a defenceman and for plus-minus (+124) by any position player. Orr's 102 assists set a league record that would not be broken until Wayne Gretzky totalled 109 in 1980–81. Orr's Bruins were heavy favourites to repeat as Cup champions, but were upset by the Montreal Canadiens and their rookie goaltender Ken Dryden, at one time Bruins' property, in the first round of the 1971 playoffs.

For the season, the Bruins gave Orr a solid gold puck, one of four they gave out to Bruins players – to each of the four Bruins who scored over 100 points that season – Esposito, Orr, Johnny Bucyk and Ken Hodge. Orr later gave his puck to Alan Eagleson.

1971–72: Second and final cup
Orr signed a new five-year contract on August 26, 1971, for US$200,000 (US$ in  dollars) per season – the NHL's first million dollar contract. In the following 1971–72 season, Orr was again second in the scoring race to Esposito, this time with 117 points, as his goal total matched his previous years total of 37, but his assists dropped to 80. He again won the Hart and Norris trophies, helping the Bruins to a first-place finish in the East. In the 1972 playoffs, Orr again led the Bruins to the Stanley Cup, leading the scoring in the playoffs (24 points with 19 assists) and scoring the championship-winning goal against New York. For his performance in the playoffs, he received his second Conn Smythe Trophy as playoff MVP, making him the award's first two-time winner. Rangers forward Vic Hadfield commented "We played them pretty even, but they had Bobby Orr and we didn't." By this time, Orr knew his left knee was deteriorating and he would not have many seasons left. Orr also won the MVP award at the 1972 NHL All-Star Game to win three MVP awards in one season. Since then only Nicklas Lidström (2002) and Cale Makar (2022) have won the Norris and Conn Smythe trophies in the same season.

1972–73
The 1972–73 saw upheaval at the Bruins. Former head coach Sinden returned to the club as the general manager. Bruins players Gerry Cheevers, Derek Sanderson and Johnny McKenzie joined the upstart World Hockey Association. Coach Tom Johnson was fired fifty-two games into the season, replaced by Bep Guidolin, who had once coached Orr. The Adams family, which had owned the team since its founding in the 1920s, sold it to Storer Broadcasting. The Bruins' season came to a premature end in a first-round loss in the 1973 playoffs, losing Esposito to injury in that first round. Orr amassed 101 points during the regular season (he only played 63 games due to injury,) but had only two points in the playoff loss.

1973–74
In 1973–74, Orr led the Bruins to another first-place finish in the regular season. His point total rebounded to 122 with 32 goals and 90 assists. That season, Orr set the record (since surpassed) for the most points in a game by a defenceman, scoring 3 goals and 4 assists in a November 15, 1973 game against the New York Rangers. One goal, a shot from the blue line, broke Rangers' defenceman Rod Seiling's stick.

The Bruins made it to the Stanley Cup final, but lost this time to the Philadelphia Flyers in six games. In game one, late in the third period tied at 2–2, Orr blocked the open Boston net with his leg to keep out a Flyers' shot on goal, then took the puck up the ice and scored on a slapshot past goaltender Bernie Parent with a little over a minute remaining in regulation time to propel the Bruins to a 3–2 win. In game five, Orr assisted on Boston's first goal with shorthanded rush, and scored the next two goals himself as the Bruins won 5–1. In the deciding game six, Orr was in the penalty box after a scuffle with the Flyers' Bobby Clarke and during the ensuing power play the Flyers scored (which turned out to be the Cup-winning goal), but with 4 seconds left and the Bruins trailing 1-0 Orr took a face-off and sent a desperation length of the ice shot that went just wide of the Flyers' net (goaltender Parent admitted "If his shot is on net, it's a goal").

1974–75
In the 1974–75 season, Orr broke his own previous record for goals by a defenceman, scoring 46 goals to go with 89 assists for his sixth straight 100-point season. His record for goals by a defenceman stood until Paul Coffey totalled 48 in 1985–86. He won the league scoring title and the Art Ross Trophy for the second time. 1974–75 was his last full season and his last season playing with Esposito. The Bruins placed second in the Adams Division, and lost to the Chicago Black Hawks in the first round of the 1975 playoffs, losing a best-of-three series, two games to one. With this season, he had tallied 100 points in six straight seasons, a record for any player of any position, forward, or defencemen (since broken), although his teammate Esposito that season also achieved his sixth (and last) 100 point season, although only five of those were consecutive. In fact, there are only eight other seasons in history of defencemen scoring 100 points or more (Paul Coffey with five, Denis Potvin, Al MacInnis and Brian Leetch, with one each).

1975–76
The 1975–76 season was Orr's final season with the Bruins and it was tumultuous. Orr's contract was ending after the season, potentially making him a free agent. The Bruins were sold by Storer Broadcasting in August 1975 and the new Jacobs ownership group had to promise to keep Orr as a condition of the purchase. The Bruins and Orr reached a verbal agreement with the Jacobs during the summer of 1975, including a controversial agreement for Orr to take an 18.5% share of the Bruins after his playing days were over. The agreement was to be checked out as to whether it would be legal for tax reasons and whether or not the league would approve it.

Before the season started, however, Orr underwent another surgical procedure on September 20, 1975. The Bruins' contract talks with Orr and Eagleson became difficult. The Bruins' insurer would not insure a contract with Orr and doctors advised the Bruins that Orr would not be able to play much longer. Orr returned to the line-up on November 8, 1975, the day after the Bruins traded Esposito to the New York Rangers. Orr was able to play the next ten games for the team but had to stop on November 28 due to pain in his knee. The next day, he underwent another surgical procedure on his knee. Originally expected to only be out for seven to eight weeks, his knee did not respond to therapy and he returned home to Parry Sound. His season was over after ten games and he would not play again for the Bruins. His impending free agency led to speculation that the Bruins would trade him, but despite his injury, they were negotiating to keep him until the end.

During his Bruins career, Orr was often the player the press wanted for a post-game interview. Orr instead would hide in the trainer's room. Teammate Terry O'Reilly described him as a "very private, very shy guy, who just happened to be the best hockey player in the world." According to the Bruins public relations director Nate Greenberg "one of my toughest jobs in the day was trying to get Orr to come out of the trainer's room to talk to the press. The reason he wouldn't or didn't all the time was that he really wanted his teammates to get proper accolades, while everybody, all the time wanted him." Orr did not authorize a biography of himself until 2013, preferring not to be the centre of attention.

Free agency, and the move to Chicago
In September 1975, the Bruins and Eagleson had reached a deal that would pay Orr US$4 million (US$ in  dollars) for ten years, but when Orr's knee required surgery, the Bruins reduced its offer to US$295,000 (US$ in  dollars) per season and a payment of US$925,000 (US$ in  dollars) or 18.6% of the Bruins in June 1980. Eagleson turned down the offer and on June 7, 1976, was quoted in the Toronto Star as saying "Boston offered a five-year deal at US$925,000 or 18.6 per cent ownership of the club in 1980. I didn't think it would be wise for him to be a player-owner." On June 9, 1976, after Orr had signed with Chicago, Eagleson told The Globe and Mail that the Bruin offer was "a five-year offer for US$295,000 a year. In addition, Orr was to receive US$925,000 in cash payable in June 1980. That was to be a cash payment or involve Orr's receiving 18.6 per cent of the Bruins stock." According to a famous 1990 story in the Toronto Star by Ellie Tesher, Orr stated that Eagleson never told him of the offer, during negotiations or after. While Eagleson had spoken publicly to reporters of the offer, he had not discussed it with Orr.

In 1976, the Bruins offered Orr US$600,000 (US$ in  dollars) per season, but he would have to pass a physical examination at the start of each season's training camp. Only the first year's money was guaranteed. Eagleson was quoted at the time as saying, "There is only one way that Bobby Orr will ever be back with the Bruins, and that's if Jeremy Jacobs asks him for another meeting and straightens out the whole situation. Otherwise he's gone." Instead, Orr became a free agent, with Boston to receive compensation. Orr and Eagleson whittled down a list of potential teams to St. Louis and Chicago. Chicago offered a five-year guaranteed contract with the Black Hawks, and on June 8, 1976, he officially signed with the Black Hawks. The Bruins' general manager, Harry Sinden complained of tampering by the Black Hawks, and demanded that Chicago owner Bill Wirtz submit to a lie detector test. According to documents held by Orr, they had a valid case. Orr signed with the Black Hawks at a secret meeting in May 1976, prior to becoming a free agent.

Then-Bruins head coach Don Cherry suggested that the reason Orr never re-signed with the Bruins was Orr's complete trust in Eagleson at the time (Orr said that he described Eagleson as a brother). Cherry recalled Orr had refused to speak with the Bruins team president directly, allowing Eagleson to mislead or withhold enough details from Boston's offer. Orr's departure from the Bruins was acrimonious and he has not held an official role with the Bruins since. Years later, it emerged that Eagleson had very good relations with Black Hawks owner Bill Wirtz and NHL president John Ziegler that colluded to hold back salaries of certain players. Orr disassociated himself from Eagleson in 1980.

Orr's contract with Chicago, five years in length, was for US$3 million (US$ in  dollars), to be paid over 30 years. Spreading out the payments in this way was done to minimize taxes. While a player, he never cashed a Chicago paycheque, stating that he was paid to play hockey and would not accept a salary if he was not playing.

1976 Canada Cup
After Orr signed with Chicago, the Black Hawks gave him permission to play for Team Canada in the 1976 Canada Cup tournament. Orr did not play in the 1972 Summit Series against the Soviet Union, and he wanted badly to play for Canada. Orr had been unable to play in the Summit Series due to knee surgery, although he did participate as a non-player. Orr's participation in the Canada Cup was considered ill-conceived and Eagleson later thought it may have been the 'last straw' that killed his career. Orr himself said that he knew before the tournament that "I knew I didn't have much longer. That series didn't do it. I thought I could get the next season in, but not much after that. I knew, looking at that team, I wouldn't have to do as much. I wouldn't have traded it for anything."

Despite his knee, Orr's performance in the Canada Cup led to him being named to the tournament All-Star team and he was named the overall MVP for the tournament. According to teammate Bobby Clarke, Orr "would hardly be able to walk on the morning of the game, and he would hardly be able to walk in the afternoon, and then, at night, he would be the best player on one of the greatest teams ever assembled. He was the best player in every game; he was the best player in the tournament. He couldn't skate like he used to, but he could still go." According to teammate Darryl Sittler, "Bobby Orr was better on one leg, than anybody else was on two."

Retirement

Orr signed with Chicago, but his injuries limited him to only 26 games over the next three seasons. He sat out the entire 1977–78 season. By 1978, Orr had undergone over a dozen knee surgical procedures, was having trouble walking and barely skated any more. However, in the summer of 1978, he decided to make a comeback. He played six games of the 1978–79 season and came to the conclusion that he could no longer play and informed the Black Hawks that he was retiring. He started a new role as an assistant to Chicago general manager Bob Pulford. He scored his last NHL goal and point against Detroit on October 28, 1978, at Detroit's Olympia Stadium.

Orr retired having scored 270 goals and 645 assists for 915 points in 657 games, adding 953 penalty minutes. At the time of his retirement, he was the leading defenceman in league history in goals, assists and points, tenth overall in assists and 19th in points. , the only retired players in league history to have averaged more points per game than Orr are Wayne Gretzky, Mario Lemieux and Mike Bossy, all of them forwards. "Losing Bobby", said Gordie Howe, "was the greatest blow the National Hockey League has ever suffered".

The Hockey Hall of Fame waived the normal three-year waiting period for induction into the Hall and he was enshrined at age 31 – the youngest player living at the time of his induction in history. Orr was the eighth player to have the three-year period waived, the next two being Mario Lemieux (1997) and Wayne Gretzky (1999), after which the Hall decided that the waiting period would no longer be waived for any player except under "certain humanitarian circumstances".

His number 4 jersey was retired by the Bruins on January 9, 1979. At the ceremony, the crowd at Boston Garden would not stop applauding and as a result, most of the evening's program had to be scrapped at the last second due to the constant cheering. The crowd did not allow Orr to say his thank you speech until he put on a Bruins jersey. The day was proclaimed "Bobby Orr Day" in Boston and the event raised thousands of dollars for charity. He attended the Massachusetts Senate and House of Representatives and was given a five-minute standing ovation. Boston Celtics basketball superstar Larry Bird said in his pre-game inspiration that he always looked up at the rafters of the Garden at Orr's retired No. 4, instead of the retired numbers of Celtics stars such as Bill Russell, Bob Cousy, or John Havlicek.

Style of play
When Orr and the Bruins visited cities, attendance was usually a sell-out. According to long-time Bruins coach and general manager Harry Sinden, "Bobby became a star in the NHL about the time they played the National Anthem for his first game with us". Columnist Dan Shaughnessy of The Boston Globe wrote that during the "Orr years. Those Bruins were the top draw in our town every day for five seasons. They were bigger than the Red Sox or Celtics".

Orr inspired the game of hockey with his command of the two-way game. Orr's offensive style has influenced countless defencemen who followed him.

In contrast to the style of hanging-back defensive play common in the later 1950s and 1960s, Orr was known for his fluid skating and end-to-end rushing. Orr's rushing enabled him to be where the puck was, allowing him not only to score effectively but also to defend when necessary. According to the Bruins' Phil Esposito, "No matter how fast an opponent was, Bobby could skate faster than him if he needed to do it in the framework of a play. If he was caught up-ice and the other team had an odd-man rush, that's when you saw his truly great speed. Very seldom did he not get back to have a hand in breaking up the play." Orr also benefited from playing most of his career in Boston Garden, which was  shorter than the standard NHL rink. This suited his rushing style very well, as he was able to get from one end of the ice to the other faster than in a standard rink.

Orr's style of play was hard on his left knee, leading to injuries and surgeries that shortened his career. The left knee took all of the punishment and was operated on "13 or 14" times according to Orr. Orr was a left-hand shot who played the right side. He would race down the right wing with the puck and attempt to beat the opposing defenceman using his speed and strength. He 'protected the puck', leading with his left knee, and holding his left arm up to fend off opponents. This put him into a position where a hit by the opposing defencemen would often hit the left knee. Also, he would often end up crashing into either the opposing goalie, the net or the end boards. "It was the way I played," Orr has said. "I liked to carry the puck and if you do that, you're going to get hit. I wish I'd played longer, but I don't regret it." Orr stated in 2008. "I had a style—when you play, you play all-out. I tried to do things. I didn't want to sit back. I wanted to be involved."

His right knee was basically undamaged during his career; his left knee looks like "a road map of downtown Boston" according to sportswriter Bob McKenzie. His left knee was used in a MasterCard commercial in 2008, his scar lines used in an animation connecting his many achievements to the year of the individual scar line. According to a 2009 Sports Illustrated article Orr has since had two knee replacement surgeries that have left him pain-free.

Orr also had a deadly accurate shot, as goaltender Philadelphia Flyers Bernie Parent admitted "If his shot is on net, it's a goal". Orr used little to no tape on his stick. In his autobiography, Orr: My Story, he said "In my case, I liked the feel of the puck on the blade without any tape at all... So the idea came to me that if I had to have tape on my stick, I would use as little as possible. Over the years, I used less and less until I was down to a single stripe. And eventually I ended up with no tape at all."

Former Montreal Canadiens goaltender Ken Dryden described of Orr: "When he began to move ... the sensation was unique: All the Canadiens began backpedalling in a small panic, like beachgoers sighting a coming monster wave. He brought others with him; he wanted them involved. That's what made him so different: It felt like a five-player stampede moving toward you—and at his pace. He pushed his teammates, [because] you're playing with the best player in the league and he's giving you the puck and you just can't mess it up. You had to be better than you'd ever been."

Philadelphia Flyers' head coach Fred Shero commented after the 1974 Stanley Cup Finals: "They had Orr and he can do an awful lot. But we've got 17 good hockey players and every one of them put out. It was 17 against one." As the other Bruins players frequently passed the puck to Orr, and since Orr's skating ability made it hard for an assigned checker to follow, Shero countered by having "all of his [Flyers] forward lines swirl around in front of the net, usually in a crossing pattern, to serve as mobile roadblocks in Orr's path".

Orr was also known for his mean streak. Former coach Don Cherry recounts an incident one night in Los Angeles during a game that the Bruins were losing. With a minute to go, Orr pulled one of the Bruins off the ice, left the bench and attacked a Los Angeles Kings player. Asked why, Orr said to Cherry "He was laughing at us." According to Cherry, he fought a lot. On another occasion in November 1967, Orr was clipped in the face by a stick from the Toronto Maple Leafs' Brian Conacher. Boston teammate Johnny McKenzie flattened Conacher from behind and started punching Conacher. Orr, cut and bleeding, got up from the ice, pulled MacKenzie off Conacher and started punching Conacher. Conacher, who was not fighting back, was also sucker-punched by the Bruins' Ken Hodge. Orr would be booed in Toronto from that date onwards. Orr was frequently compared to Brad Park, who played a similar style to Orr and later succeeded Orr as Boston's top defenceman, and the two often fought each other on-ice, fuelling the bitter rivalry between the Bruins and New York Rangers. Park said "I saw no reason to be upset because I was rated second to Bobby Orr. After all, Orr not only was the top defenceman in the game, but he was considered the best player ever to put on a pair of skates. There was nothing insulting about being rated number two to such a super superstar".

Post-hockey career
Shortly after Orr retired, an independent accountant revealed that Orr's liabilities exceeded his assets, leaving him essentially bankrupt despite being supposedly one of the highest-paid players in the NHL. As well, Orr's taxes were under review. Eagleson had set up a corporation to receive Orr's income and pay Orr a salary, but the arrangement was rejected by US and Canadian tax authorities. His assets in July 1980 totalled US$456,604 (US$ in  dollars) and his tax, legal and accounting bills totalled US$469,546 (US$ in  dollars). Eagleson, who had once said Orr was 'fixed for life', criticized Orr for 'living beyond his means' and ignoring his investment advice. Orr split with Eagleson on April 1, 1980. As part of the legal settlement with Orr, Eagleson agreed to purchase various assets of Orr's for US$620,000 (US$ in  dollars), including his Orr–Walton Hockey Camp, which paid off US$450,000 (US$ in  dollars) of Orr's bank loans.

Orr served briefly as an assistant coach for Chicago, and as a consultant to the NHL and the Hartford Whalers. The Black Hawks balked at paying him the balance of his contract, and Orr took them to court, settling in 1983 for US$450,000 (US$ in  dollars), one-third of the money they owed him. Of this, US$200,000 (US$ in  dollars) went to taxes and legal fees. Orr moved back to the Boston area and formed Can-Am Enterprises with partners Tom Kelly and Paul Shanley, which built up a clientele of endorsements for Orr, including Baybank and Standard Brands. Orr did eventually restore his finances, thanks to endorsement contracts and public relations work.

Orr later played a role in the exposure of Eagleson's misconduct over the years. He had once considered Eagleson a "big brother", but broke with him in 1980 in part because he suspected that Eagleson had not been truthful with him. In addition to misleading his clients about contract terms, Eagleson fraudulently used NHLPA funds to enrich himself. Orr was one of several players who filed a formal complaint of legal misconduct against Eagleson with the Law Society of Upper Canada over Eagleson's lending of trust monies without the consent or knowledge of his clients. In 1998, Eagleson was convicted of fraud, embezzlement and racketeering. After the conviction, Orr was one of eighteen former players who threatened to resign from the Hockey Hall of Fame if Eagleson was not removed as a builder. Facing almost certain removal, Eagleson resigned instead.

Orr was also involved in the 1991 lawsuit of retired NHL players against the NHL over its control of the players' pension fund. Eagleson was involved there too, arranging for the players to give up a seat on the trusteeship of the pension fund in 1969 to gain the acceptance of the NHLPA with the NHL owners. Orr and ex-Bruin Dave Forbes discussed the lawsuit with the sports newspaper The National. Orr: "Our money is being used to pay pensions for current players". The NHL's response was to file a notice of libel and slander against Orr and Forbes. Carl Brewer defended Orr in a letter to then-NHL president John Ziegler: "It is regrettable that the NHL and the member clubs would resort to such treatment of one of our game's icons, Bobby Orr. And isn't it interesting that baseball players who started their pension plan in 1947, as did the NHL, have assets in their plan of some US$500 million while we, as far as we can understand, have US$31.9 million." The pension lawsuit was finally won by the players in 1994 after two courts ruled against the NHL. The NHL had appealed the case to the Supreme Court of Canada which decided not to hear the case.

Orr became an agent representing hockey players in 1996. Along with investors, Orr purchased the Woolf Associates agency founded by Boston lawyer Bob Woolf. To prevent conflicts of interest, Orr sold an investment in the Lowell Lock Monsters minor pro hockey team and cut his ties with a credit card firm that had a contract with the NHLPA. Orr became a certified agent, although he would not be negotiating with hockey clubs. Player agent Rick Curran merged his agency with Orr's in 2000. Curran and Orr along with partner Paul Krepelka incorporated the agency as Orr Hockey Group in February 2002.

The group represents such NHL players as Jeff Carter, Steve Downie, Taylor Hall, Nathan Horton, Connor McDavid, Adam McQuaid, Colton Orr (no relation), Patrick Sharp, Jason Spezza, Eric Staal, Jordan Staal, Marc Staal, and Cam Ward. Spezza, asked to comment on the experience of having Orr as an agent, replied: "I don't think I have a true feeling for how great he is. I have so much respect for him. I watch him on tapes and it's just ridiculous how good he was compared to the guys he was playing against. He's a great guy and you don't even know it's Bobby Orr, the way he talks to you."

For a number of years, Orr has coached a team of top Canadian Hockey League junior players against a similar team coached by Don Cherry in the annual CHL Top Prospects Game. Cherry, briefly his former coach in Boston, considers Orr the greatest hockey player who ever lived, noting that Orr was a complete all-around player who could skate, score, fight, and defend. , Orr's teams have won most of the games, winning seven of the eleven times Orr has coached against Cherry. Orr's participation was criticized as a conflict of interest while he was a player's agent and he stopped coaching in the series. Organizers of the series convinced Orr to return to coaching in the series. He stepped down again before the 2011 game for the birth of his second grandchild. One of the teams remained named 'Team Orr.'

Since retiring, Orr has performed a number of ceremonial first puck drops with the Bruins, including at the 2010 NHL Winter Classic with Bobby Clarke, between the Bruins and the Flyers. Orr performed another ceremonial puck drop on October 20, 2016, Orr along with Milt Schmidt dropped the ceremonial puck at the Boston Bruins' first home game of the season.

On November 3, 2013, Orr's long-awaited autobiography titled Orr: My Story, debuted at the #8 position on The New York Times best seller list for nonfiction.

Personal life
While on vacation, Orr met Margaret Louise "Peggy" Wood, a Trenton, Michigan native and speech therapist who worked in Fort Lauderdale, Florida. They became engaged on Christmas Day, 1972, and married in September 1973 at a 'secret' ceremony in Parry Sound. They have two sons, Darren and Brent. Darren works as a player's agent at Orr Hockey Group. Orr's mother Arva died in November 2000, 18 months after being diagnosed with cancer. Orr's father Doug died in 2007. Orr became a grandfather when granddaughter Alexis was born in 2009. A second grandchild, Robert, was born in January 2011.

Orr has been known to be fiercely loyal to former Bruin personnel and teammates. When Derek Sanderson had alcohol and prescription drug-abuse problems and wound up penniless, Orr spent his own money to ensure that Sanderson successfully completed rehab. Decades later, Orr and Sanderson went into business together managing finances for hockey players. Orr also helped out Bruins trainer John (Frosty) Forristall, his roommate during his first years with the Bruins, who had just been fired from the Tampa Bay Lightning for alcoholism in 1994. Forristall's drinking put him on bad terms with his brother John, so he returned to Boston jobless and soon afterwards was diagnosed with brain cancer. Orr took Forristall into his home for a year until he died at the age of 51. Orr was a pallbearer at his funeral.

Orr is also well known for his charitable works, although he kept mention of them out of the press. Former Eagle-Tribune writer Russ Conway noted of one occasion when Orr and Conway visited Boston Children's Hospital, with a box of programs, pennants, pucks, pictures and Boston memorabilia: "We went from room to room, Orr popping in, unannounced to visit the kids. Some couldn't believe their eyes; sick as they were, they laughed in astonishment and delight. Bobby Orr! He talked and joked with every one of them, asking names, rubbing heads, giving everybody a little present from the box, leaving a stick, autographing everything in sight." Orr made Conway promise to not print a word in the newspaper. Orr was involved in numerous charity fund raisers. In 1980, Orr was awarded the Multiple Sclerosis Silver Hope Chest Award by the Multiple Sclerosis Society for his "numerous and unselfish contributions to society".

Among other personal interests, Orr has a passion for fishing which he has had since childhood. He has a talent for solving jigsaw puzzles quickly. Orr is also known for his taste in clothes and style of dress. When living as a bachelor with Forristall during his years with the Bruins, Orr was also known for keeping a clean apartment and not drinking, smoking, or night-clubbing. Orr projected a clean image.

A Canadian citizen, Orr provoked extensive criticism starting in October 2020 when he took out a full-page ad in the New Hampshire Union-Leader exalting Donald Trump's character and urging American voters to re-elect him.

Honours
In 1970, Orr received the Golden Plate Award of the American Academy of Achievement. In 1979, Orr was invested as an officer in the Order of Canada. Two buildings in his hometown of Parry Sound are named after Orr. The first is the Bobby Orr Hall of Fame, where his Order of Canada medal is on display along with other exhibits. The second is the Bobby Orr Community Centre, a multi-purpose entertainment facility. In 1995, Bobby Orr was inducted into the Ontario Sports Hall of Fame. Orr has been honoured with a star on Canada's Walk of Fame in Toronto. In 2004, an elementary school in South Oshawa named after Orr opened. On November 27, 2008, the Oshawa Generals retired Orr's number 2 jersey; the Generals had not issued the number since Orr transferred to the NHL in 1966. Orr thanked all who helped him in the four years he played in Oshawa: "I did a lot of growing up in Oshawa from ages 14 to 18 and I'll be forever grateful for those people who helped me in that time of my life." In February 2010, Orr was one of the eight bearers of the Olympic flag at the Opening Ceremonies of the 2010 Vancouver Olympics.

A bronze statue of Orr stands next to Boston's TD Garden, the Bruins' home arena. It was unveiled on May 10, 2010, the 40th anniversary of the Bruins' first Stanley Cup victory with Orr, and depicts him immediately after scoring the winning goal. The unveiling ceremony was attended by Orr and several of his former teammates. Orr said of the statue at the ceremony, "This specific moment and time we celebrate with this statue is something we can all now nostalgically remember with fondness, together, each time we enter Boston Garden. To all of you, thank you very much from the bottom of my heart. I'm honoured. Guys, thank you." In 2012, he received the Queen Elizabeth II Diamond Jubilee Medal.

Career achievements
Despite playing only twelve seasons and 657 games (of which only his first nine seasons, totalling 621 games, were full seasons), and only playing 47 NHL games after his 27th birthday, Orr accomplished many records and achievements, a number of which still stand today, and are listed below.

As of the end of the  season:
 First and only defenceman to score nine hat tricks.
 First defenceman to score 30 goals (1969–70)  and 40 goals (1974–75) in a season.
 First player to record 100 assists in a season (1970–71) 
 Only defenceman to win the Art Ross Trophy as league leader in scoring (1969–70, 1974–75)
 Only defenceman to win the Lester B Pearson Award.
 Only player ever to win the Norris Trophy, Art Ross Trophy, Hart Trophy, and Conn Smythe Trophy in one season (1969–70) 
 Highest single season plus-minus rating, +124 in 1970–71.
Second all-time in career plus-minus rating (+597; retired as the overall leader)
Never finished a full season less than +30 since +/- became a statistic (beginning with the  season) 
 Fourth in league history in career point-per-game average, all-time, (1.393) (highest among defencemen, minimum 500 career points). 
 Sixty-sixth overall in league history in career assists and tied for 109th in career points.

Awards
 OHA first All-Star team – 1964, 1965, 1966 
 Awarded the Calder Memorial Trophy (rookie of the year) in 1967, the youngest ever to win the award, and the youngest ever to win a major NHL award up to that time.
 Named to the NHL second All-Star team in 1967 (his only full season when he did not make the First Team, as a rookie) 
 Played in the NHL All-Star Game in 1968, 1969, 1970, 1971, 1972, 1973, 1975
 Named to the NHL first All-Star team in 1968, 1969, 1970, 1971, 1972, 1973, 1974, 1975 
 Won the James Norris Trophy in 1968, 1969, 1970, 1971, 1972, 1973, 1974, 1975 
 NHL Plus/Minus leader in 1969, 1970, 1971, 1972, 1974 and 1975, the most in history.
 Won the Art Ross Trophy in 1970 and 1975 
 Won the Hart Memorial Trophy in 1970, 1971, 1972 
 Awarded the Conn Smythe Trophy in 1970 and 1972, the first two-time winner of the playoff MVP award 
 Stanley Cup champion in 1970 and 1972 
 Won Lou Marsh Trophy as Canadian athlete of the year in 1970 
 Received Sports Illustrated magazine's "Sportsman of the Year" award in 1970 
 NHL All-Star Game MVP in 1972 
 Voted the greatest athlete in Boston history in the Boston Globe newspaper's poll of New Englanders in 1975, beating out baseball and basketball stars such as Ted Williams, Bill Russell, Carl Yastrzemski and Bob Cousy.
 Awarded the Lester B. Pearson Award in 1975 
 Named the Canada Cup Tournament MVP in 1976 
 Awarded the Lester Patrick Trophy in 1979 
 His #4 Jersey is retired by the Boston Bruins.

 Inducted into the Hockey Hall of Fame in 1979, with the mandatory three-year waiting period waived, making him the youngest inductee at 31 years of age.
 Voted the second greatest hockey player of all time by an expert committee in 1997 by The Hockey News. Orr is behind only Wayne Gretzky and ahead of Gordie Howe as well as being named the top defenceman of all time. Gretzky said he'd have voted for Orr, or for his hero, Gordie Howe.
 Ranked 31 in ESPN's SportsCentury: 50 Greatest Athletes of the 20th Century in 1999 
 Named the top defenceman of all time in 2010 by The Hockey News 
 In 2017, Orr was named by the National Hockey League as one of the "100 Greatest NHL Players" in history.

Records
 Most points in one NHL season by a defenceman (139; 1970–71) 
 Most assists in one NHL season by a defenceman (102; 1970–71). 
 Most 100-point seasons by a defenceman (1969–70 to 1974–75).
 Highest plus/minus in one NHL season (+124; 1970–71) 
 Most assists in one NHL game by a defenceman (6; tied with Babe Pratt, Pat Stapleton, Ron Stackhouse, Paul Coffey and Gary Suter) 
 The only player to win four major NHL awards in one season (Hart, Norris, Art Ross, and Conn Smythe in 1970), as well as the only player to win the Norris and Art Ross in the same season. 
 Fastest goal from start of overtime to clinch the Stanley Cup (0:40; 1970, game 4) 

 Records since surpassed
 Most assists in one NHL season from 1970 to 1981 (87 in 1969–70, which he surpassed in 1970–71 with 102; broken by Wayne Gretzky and also bettered by Mario Lemieux) 
 Most goals in one NHL season by a defenceman from 1969 to 1986 (21, in 1968–69, 33 in 1969–70, 37 in 1970–71, broke own record in 1974–75 with 46; broken in 1985–86 by Paul Coffey with 48) 
 Most points by a defenceman in one game from 1973 until 1977 (7) in game November 15, 1973) 
 Longest consecutive point-scoring streak by a defenceman from 1971 until 1984 (15 games, set in 1970–71 and 1973–74) 
 Career goal-scoring by a defenceman (270) until surpassed by Denis Potvin in 1986. 
 Held record for most consecutive 100-or-more point seasons by any player from 1974 until 1980 (6, from 1969–70 until 1974–75) 
 Career plus-minus rating from 1978 until 1985 (+597)

Career statistics

Regular season and playoffs
 Career highs in each statistical category are marked in bold

International play
Was named to Canada's 1972 Summit Series team, but did not play due to injuries.
Played for Team Canada in the 1976 Canada Cup.

International statistics

See also
List of NHL players with 100-point seasons

References

Bibliography

External links
 
 
 Order of Canada Citation
 Bobby Orr Hall of Fame
 
 

1948 births
Living people
Art Ross Trophy winners
Boston Bruins players
Calder Trophy winners
Canadian ice hockey coaches
Canadian ice hockey defencemen
Canadian people of Ulster-Scottish descent
Canadian sports agents
Chicago Blackhawks coaches
Chicago Blackhawks players
Conn Smythe Trophy winners
Hart Memorial Trophy winners
Hartford Whalers
Hockey Hall of Fame inductees
Ice hockey people from Ontario
James Norris Memorial Trophy winners
Lester B. Pearson Award winners
Lester Patrick Trophy recipients
Lou Marsh Trophy winners
National Hockey League All-Stars
National Hockey League players with retired numbers
Officers of the Order of Canada
Oshawa Generals players
Sportspeople from Parry Sound, Ontario
Stanley Cup champions